Inverness, Nairn and Lochaber was a county constituency of the House of Commons of the Parliament of the United Kingdom from 1983 to 1997. It elected one Member of Parliament (MP) by the first-past-the-post system of election.

History
Throughout the 1983 to 1997 period, this marginal constituency was represented by a Liberal, and then Liberal Democrat, MP: Sir David Russell Johnston (later Baron Russell-Johnston), who had been, previously, MP for the Inverness constituency.

Boundaries 

The constituency was created to cover four of the eight districts of Highland local government region: the Inverness district, the Nairn district, the Lochaber district and the Badenoch and Strathspey district. The region and districts had been created in 1975, under the Local Government (Scotland) Act 1973, when the county and burgh system of local government was abolished. The other districts of the region were covered by the Ross, Cromarty and Skye constituency and the Caithness and Sutherland constituency.

In 1996, under the Local Government etc (Scotland) Act 1994, the districts were abolished and the region became a unitary council area.

In 1997, constituency boundaries were redrawn to divide the Highland area between three new constituencies: Inverness East, Nairn and Lochaber, Ross, Skye and Inverness West and Caithness, Sutherland and Easter Ross. New constituency boundaries divided the areas of some of the former districts.

Members of Parliament

Election results

Elections in the 1980s

Elections in the 1990s
In the 1992 election, the four major parties were separated by only 3.41%, the closest four-way result in an election to the UK Parliament since 1918.

References 

Historic parliamentary constituencies in Scotland (Westminster)
Constituencies of the Parliament of the United Kingdom established in 1983
Constituencies of the Parliament of the United Kingdom disestablished in 1997
Highland constituencies, UK Parliament (historic)